The Balochi Academy promotes the Balochi culture through the development and promotion of the language and literature; support for literary circles; conducting seminars and conferences; and inviting academics from different parts of Pakistan and abroad as guest speakers. It was officially established in 1961, and is located in Quetta, the capital of the Pakistani province Balochistan.

It publishes books in Balochi, Pashto, Urdu, English and Persian.

History 
The academy was established in 1958.

Before 1997 the Academy didn’t have a building of its own. In 1997, Chief Minister of Balochistan Akhtar Mengal, who was interested in supporting the language, provided the Academy with land and a grant to construct its own building.

In 1999, the complex was officially opened. It is a three-story building in central Quetta with a library and conference hall.

Chairmen
 Sangat Rafiq

References

Further reading
 The Balochi Academy Abdul Qadir Shahwani, 2000 (Balochi Academy, Quetta)

Balochi language
Organisations based in Quetta
Language advocacy organizations
1958 establishments in Pakistan
Government agencies of  Balochistan, Pakistan